Lolly Scramble may refer to:
Lolly Scramble, a book written by Tony Martin
Lolly scramble, a children's party game in Australia and New Zealand